Zaevius is a monotypic moth genus in the family Erebidae. Its only species, Zaevius calocore, is found in French Guiana, Guyana and Venezuela. Both the genus and species were first described by Harrison Gray Dyar Jr. in 1910.

References

Phaegopterina
Monotypic moth genera
Moths described in 1910